Malavalli Assembly constituency is one of the 224 constituencies in the Karnataka Legislative Assembly of Karnataka a south state of India. It is also part of Mandya Lok Sabha constituency.

Members of Legislative Assembly

Mysore State
 1951 (Seat-1): B. P. Nagaraja Murthy, Kisan Mazdoor Praja Party
 1951 (Seat-2): M. C. Chikkalingaiah, Scheduled Castes Federation

 1957 (Seat-1): H. V. Veeregowda, Indian National Congress
 1957 (Seat-2): M. Mallikarjunaswamy, Indian National Congress

 1962: G. Madegowda, Indian National Congress

 1967: M. Mallikarjunaswamy, Indian National Congress

 1972: M. Mallikarjunaswamy, Indian National Congress

Karnataka State
 1978: K. L. Mariswami, Janata Party

 1983: B. Somashekar, Janata Party

 1985: B. Somashekar, Janata Party

 1989: Mallajamma, Indian National Congress

 1994: B. Somashekar, Janata Dal

 1999: B. Somashekar, Janata Dal (United)

 2004: K. Annadani, Janata Dal (Secular)

 2008: P. M. Narendra Swamy, Independent

 2013: P. M. Narendra Swamy, Indian National Congress

 2018: K. Annadani, Janata Dal (Secular)

See also
 Mandya district
 List of constituencies of Karnataka Legislative Assembly

References

Assembly constituencies of Karnataka
Mandya district